Suldan may refer to:
 Suldan, Chabahar
 Suldan, Sarbaz
 ( Suldan, Shurie) Sweden, Gävle.